Poonam Singar is an Indian actress who has worked in Kannada, Telugu and Tamil language films.

Career
Poonam briefly worked under the stage name of Vyjyanthi in Tamil cinema. Despite working on Balasekaran's Solli Vidu and Thirunaal, her earlier films did not have a theatrical release. Her first release became Vanna Thamizh Pattu (2000).

She later returned to work on Telugu films including Friends Colony, Paata and Nesthama.

Filmography

References

Living people
Indian film actresses
Actresses in Tamil cinema
Actresses in Kannada cinema
Actresses in Telugu cinema
Year of birth missing (living people)
21st-century Indian actresses